Le Sourire was a French monthly magazine existed between August 1899 and April 1900.

Original Version
Le Sourire was a monthly periodical published by the French artist Paul Gauguin. The editions contained satirical copy, illustrated by his pen and screen drawings, with one of his woodcuts used for the header. It was in part inspired by the more successful Parisian periodical Le Rire, illustrated by artists such as Toulouse-Lautrec.

A total of nine editions were printed during August 1899 and April 1900, between his stays in Tahiti and the Marquesas Islands. It is not known how many copies of each edition were printed, probably not more than 30. Due to a limited budget, and the fact that they were hand printed, the quality of the reproductions was often poor and blotchy, he used cheap glue to bind the leaves to the paper. However, they are admired by art critics and historians today.

Second Version 

A second version of Le Sourire began on 25 August 1899 under the operation of Maurice Mery, who had experience with art review journals and newspapers.  This weekly version came out on Saturdays under the editorship of Alphonse Allais.  Le Sourire suspended publishing with the advent of the First World War, but resumed on 14 April 1917 with Rudolphe Bringer at the helm.

The revived magazine was known as Le Sourire de France and had more risque content, frequently featuring covers with pin-up style art and jokes. In 1922 Paul Briquet became the director and held the position until 1930. The magazine itself continued with weekly publication until 30 September 1939, when it became bi-weekly. However, this ended in May 1940 with the fall of France.

Gallery

References

Sources
 Miller, Ethan. Masterpieces of Impressionism and Post-impressionism. NY: Metropolitan Museum of Art

Monthly magazines published in France
Magazines established in 1899
Magazines disestablished in 1900
Paul Gauguin
French-language magazines